Felix Maurice Hippisley Markham (1908 in Brighton – 1992) was a British historian, known for his biography of Napoleon Bonaparte.

Markham studied at the University of Oxford and taught there for 40 years. He was Fellow and History Tutor at Hertford College, Oxford, from 1931 until 1973.

Markham corresponded with film director Stanley Kubrick over a never-realised project of Kubrick's on Napoleon Bonaparte.

Publications 
Napoleon, New American Library 1963, new edition, edited by Steve Englund, Signet Classics 2010
Napoleon and the Awakening of Europe, English Universities Press 1954, Collier Books 1965
The Bonapartes, New York, Taplinger Publishing 1975
Herausgeber: Henri Comte de Saint-Simon, 1760–1825: Selected Writings, Blackwell 1952
"The Napoleonic Adventure", in The New Cambridge Modern History, Volume 9, 1965
Oxford, London 1975, preface by C. M. Bowra

References

1908 births
1992 deaths
Alumni of the University of Oxford
Fellows of Hertford College, Oxford
20th-century British historians